Knut Harold Raudstein (15 April 1917 in La Center, Washington – 13 December 1988 in San Antonio, Texas) was an American Major in the United States Army during World War II. He was a recipient of the Distinguished Service Cross which was awarded for having distinguished himself by extraordinary heroism against an armed enemy.

Awards
Parachutist Badge
Distinguished Service Cross in 1944 as Captain in Company C, 1st Battalion, 506th Parachute Infantry Regiment, 101st Airborne Division
Bronze Star Medal
Purple Heart with oak leaf cluster

References

1917 births
1988 deaths
United States Army personnel of World War II
Recipients of the Distinguished Service Cross (United States)
United States Army officers